Idhu Nijama is a 1948 Tamil-language thriller film directed by Krishna Gopal and produced by S. Soundararajan Ayyengar. The film dialogue was written by V. Seetharaman. The film script was written by S. Balachander as well as the music, an asset to the film. The film starred S. Balachander (as twins), Sarojini and Kumari N. Rajam, playing lead, with V. Seetharaman, Manuel, Pattammal and A. S. Nagarajan playing supporting roles. This film was inspired by the American Classic film Wonder Man (1945). Decades later, Kamal Haasan's Kalyanaraman was heavily inspired by Wonder Man and Idhu Nijama. The film was ran successfully in many centres.

Background
S. Balachander made a grand reentry in cinema with Idhu Nijama in 1948/K. G. Productions. The film based on the English classic Wonder Man in 1945, produced by Samuel Goldwyn. Wonder Man had Arthur Sheekman's story reworked to a riveting screenplay by Jack Jevne and Eddie Moran, and directed by H. Bruce Humberstone. Wonder Man had Danny Kaye playing the dual role of Edwin Dingle and his twin Buzzy Bellew. Idhu Nijama was financed by S. Soundararajan Ayyengar and directed by Krishna Gopal, who was acclaimed as a technical wizard those days. S. Balachander watched the movie repeatedly and observed all the finer points of the film. He came up with a brilliant screenplay suitable for an Indian milieu. The set of London City such as the famous Westminster Bridge was so realistically designed and impressively photographed (Krishna Gopal) that many movie goers thought the sequence was shot on location in England. The film was shot at the famous Ranjit Studio in Bombay.

Plot
The twin brothers are Madhavan (Madhu) and Gopal (S. Balachander). Madhu goes for higher studies in London city and Gopal runs a Musical instrument shop in Chennai. Madhu was killed in London because of love matters, whose ghost comes back to his house and reveals the reasons of his death. Madhu was only visible to his twin brother Gopal. When Gopal spells the word Ma, who enters the body of Gopal and how Gopal goes about avenging the murder of Madhu fills the rest of reels. Kumari Rajam played Madhu's pair while Sarojini played Gopal's sweetheart.

Cast
 S. Balachander as Madhavan/Gopal (Twin Brothers)
 Sarojini as Nalini, Gopal's Sweetheart
 Kumari N. Rajam as Nirmala, Madhu's Sweetheart
 V. Seetharaman
 Manuel
 Pattammal
 A. S. Nagarajan

Soundtrack
Music by S. Balachander and lyrics were written by M. S. Subramaniam. The playback singers consists of S. Balachander, Radha Jayalakshmi and P. Leela.

References

External links
 
 

1948 films
1940s Tamil-language films
Indian black-and-white films
Films with screenplays by Javar Seetharaman
Films set in London
Films set in Chennai
Films shot in Mumbai
1940s thriller films
1940s romance films
1940s crime films
Indian remakes of American films
Indian ghost films
Crime in film
Indian horror films
Films scored by S. Balachander
Films based on short fiction